Bahrabis is a village in Bajura District in Sudurpashchim Province of north-western Nepal. At the time of the 1991 Nepal census it had a population of 5,543 and had 1169 houses in the village.

References

Populated places in Bajura District